Octave One is a group of American techno musicians composed of siblings Lenny Burden and Lawrence Burden, sometimes associated with their three other brothers, Lorne Burden, Lynell Burden and Lance Burden. In 1989, The band debuted on Derrick May's Transmat record label with the single "I Believe". In 1990, "I Believe" was included on the compilation Techno 2: The Next Generation (10 Records). Also In 1990, with their brother Lynell, they formed the record label 430 West Records to release the vinyl record Octave One "The Octivation EP". Octave One have remixed recordings for Massive Attack, Joey Negro, DJ Rolando, Steve Bug, John Thomas, The Trammps, Rhythm is Rhythm, and Inner City. In 2000, Octave One released their most commercially successful recording, "Blackwater". In 2002, "Blackwater" was remixed by the band with a reworked live string arrangement performed by the Urban Soul Orchestra in London, England. The single was re-released by Concept Music (United Kingdom), Ministry of Sound/Voidcom (Germany), Vendetta Records (Spain), and Tinted (Australia) in the same year. It peaked at #47 (February 2002) and #69 (September 2002) in the UK Singles Chart.

Octave One tour the world as live electronic musicians. They are included in the second generation of Detroit Techno artists.

Mainly known for their techno recordings, the Burden brothers have also produced many recordings of house music and other electronic genres using other pseudonyms, in particular Random Noise Generation, Metro D (with Terrell Langston) and Never On Sunday.

Discography

Octave One

Random Noise Generation

References

External links
Discogs entry.. Retrieved February 21, 2009. (Searchable database of discographies.)
 RA Artist Page
 Octave One biography
 Octave One Interview
 [ Allmusic Artist Page]
 Octave One website
 Octave One myspace page
 interview Electronic Directory
Interview on Jekyllethyde.fr

Techno music groups
Electronic music groups from Michigan
American electronic musicians
Artists from Michigan